is a Japanese competition boulderer. She competed at the 2020 Summer Olympics, in Women's combined, winning a silver medal.

Life 
Her father and sister introduced her to climbing when she was 9, and she competed in her first world cup aged 17. She is one of the most successful young climbers on the Bouldering World Cup circuit and has recently started competing in speed and lead in preparation for the 2020 Tokyo Olympics, where climbers are supposed to compete in all disciplines. In 2018, she won the Bouldering World Cup by earning one gold medal and six silver medals in the seven events of that season.In 2019, she won three Climbing Japan Cup competitions: Bouldering Japan Cup, Speed Japan Cup, and Combined Japan Cup.

In December 2020, Nonaka's qualification for the Tokyo 2020 Olympics was confirmed after a dispute between the IFSC and the Japan Mountaineering and Sport Climbing Association. In 2022 she won bronze medal at the World Cup in Innsbruck.

Rankings

Climbing World Cup

Climbing World Championships 
Youth

Adult

World Cup podiums

Bouldering

Speed

References

External links 

 
 
 
 

1997 births
Living people
Female climbers
Japanese rock climbers
Sportspeople from Tokyo
World Games silver medalists
Competitors at the 2017 World Games
Sport climbers at the 2020 Summer Olympics
Olympic sport climbers of Japan
Olympic silver medalists for Japan
Olympic medalists in sport climbing
Medalists at the 2020 Summer Olympics
21st-century Japanese women
Competitors at the 2022 World Games
IFSC Climbing World Championships medalists
IFSC Climbing World Cup overall medalists
Boulder climbers